(provisional designation ) is a binary near-Earth asteroid and potentially hazardous asteroid of the Apollo group. It was discovered on 9 November 1991, by Australian astronomer Robert McNaught at Siding Spring Observatory. This binary system is composed of a roughly-spheroidal primary body about one kilometre in diameter, and an elongated natural satellite less than half a kilometre in diameter. The  system is unusual for its dynamically excited state; the satellite has a tumbling, non-synchronous rotation that chaotically exchanges energy and angular momentum with its precessing, eccentric orbit. This asteroid system was one of the two targets of NASA's upcoming Janus Mayhem mission, until the delay of the rocket launch made both targets inaccessible.

Numbering and naming 
This minor planet was numbered by the Minor Planet Center on 27 February 2002. It has not yet been named.

Orbit 
 orbits the Sun at a distance of 0.98–1.30 AU once every 1.21 years (443 days). Its orbit has an eccentricity of 0.14 and an inclination of 14° with respect to the ecliptic.

Close approaches 
It has made multiple close approaches to Earth, with the closest being  or 17.8 LD on 15 August 2008.

Physical characteristics

Diameter, shape, and albedo 
High-resolution radar imaging from Goldstone and Arecibo Observatory in 2008 show that the  primary is a roughly-spheroidal object with an equatorial ridge, bearing resemblance to a spinning top. A number of topographical features, including a -wide concavity, are present along the object's equatorial ridge. A bright linear feature casting a shadow at the object's mid- to high-latitudes was also seen in the 2008 radar images.

The geometric albedo for the primary is 0.17–0.18, considerably lower than infrared-based estimates of 0.30–0.40.

Mass and density 

Spectral type 
In the SMASS taxonomy,  is classified as a transitional Sk-type, which is an intermediary between the common stony S-type and the less frequent K-type asteroids.

Rotation 
Photometric observations in 1997 determined a primary rotation period of 2.624 hours, with a light curve amplitude of  magnitudes. Later photometric observations from 2003–2020 corroborated this result down to a precision of ±0.0001 seconds.

Satellite 

 is the secondary component and natural satellite of the  system.

Discovery 
It was discovered on 27 February 1997, by astronomers Petr Pravec, Marek Wolf, and Lenka Šarounová at Ondřejov Observatory. The satellite was detected through photometric observations of periodic dips in the system's brightness, caused by mutual eclipses and occultations of the components. The discovery of the satellite was reported in a notice published by the International Astronomical Union on 29 March 1997, but was not officially confirmed until it was individually resolved in adaptive optics imaging by the Keck II telescope at Mauna Kea Observatory on 9 August 2008. The satellite was given the provisional designation  on 19 September 2008.

Origin 
As with many binary near-Earth asteroids, the  system is thought to have formed through rotational fissioning of a progenitor body due to spin-up by the YORP effect. The resulting mass shed from the progenitor body coalesced in orbit to form the satellite.

Exploration

This asteroid system was the target of NASA's upcoming Janus Mayhem mission, which was planned to launch in 2022 alongside NASA's Psyche spacecraft, and to arrive in 2026.  became impossible to reach for Janus when the launch of Psyche got delayed in May 2022.

See also 
 , binary near-Earth asteroid and former target of the Janus Serenity mission, until it became inaccessible due to the launch delay

Notes

References

External links 
 Asteroid (35107) 1991 VH, Small Bodies Data Ferret, NASA
 LCDB Data for (35107) 1991 VH, Asteroid Lightcurve Database
 Photometric observations of the unrelaxed binary near-Earth asteroid (35107) 1991 VH in support of the NASA Janus space mission – Detection of a spin-orbit interaction, Petr Pravec et al., 7th IAA Planetary Defense Conference, International Academy of Astronautics, 27 April 2021
 Radar observations of (35107) 1991 VH, Jean-Luc Margot et al. Department of Earth and Space Sciences, University of California, Los Angeles
 1991 VH double period lightcurve, Petr Pravec, Astronomical Institute of Czech Academy of Sciences (Archived 6 December 1998)
 
 

035107
Minor planet object articles (numbered)
Discoveries by Robert H. McNaught
035107
035107
035107
19911109